The Golgi matrix is a collection of proteins involved in the structure and function of the Golgi apparatus. The matrix was first isolated in 1994 as an amorphous collection of 12 proteins that remained associated together in the presence of detergent (which removed Golgi membranes) and 150 mM NaCl (which removed weakly associated proteins). Treatment with a protease enzyme removed the matrix, which confirmed the importance of proteins for the matrix structure. Modern freeze etch electron microscopy (EM) clearly shows a mesh connecting Golgi cisternae and associated vesicles. Further support for the existence of a matrix comes from EM images showing that ribosomes are excluded from regions between and near Golgi cisternae.

Structure and function

The first individual protein component of the matrix was identified in 1995 as Golgin A2 (then called GM130). Since then, many other golgin family proteins have been found to be in the Golgi matrix and are associated with the Golgi membranes in a variety of ways. For example, GMAP210 (Golgi Microtubule Associated Protein 210) has an ALPS (Amphipathic Lipid-Packing Sensor) motif in the N-termal 38 amino acids and an ARF1-binding domain called GRAB (Grip-Related Arf-Binding) at the C-terminus. Thus, the GRAB-domain can bind indirectly to Golgi cisternae and its ALPS motif can tether vesicles.
Golgins have coiled-coil domains and are thus predicted to have elongated structures up to 200 nm in length. Most are peripheral membrane proteins attached at one end to Golgi membranes. They have flexible regions between the coiled-coil domains, which make them ideal candidates for mediating the dynamic vesicle docking to Golgi cisternae and dynamic structure of the Golgi itself.

Golgi reassembly-stacking proteins are an evolutionarily conserved family of proteins in the Golgi matrix. GRASP65 and GRASP55 are the 2 human GRASPs. These proteins were named from their requirement for accurate Golgi reassembly during an in vitro assay, but they have also been shown to function in vivo, as shown in the accompanying figure. GRASPs associate with lipid bilayers because they are myristoylated and their myristic acid residue intercalates into the lipid layer. Their trans oligomerization is controlled by phosphorylation and is thought to explain the fragmentation of the Golgi as required during mitosis.

Components

Bicaudal D homolog
 CASP
 CG-NAP
COH1 
 GCC88
 GCC185
 GCP60
Giantin
 GMAP210
Golgin A2
 Golgin A7
Golgin 45
Golgin 67 and the product of duplicated gene GOLGA8A 
Golgin 84
Golgin 97
Golgin 160
Golgin 245
 GORAB
GRASP55 
GRASP65 
 JAKMIP2
 JAKMIP3
 TMF1
USO1

Disease associations
CG-NAP hereditary Long QT syndrome LQT11
COH1 Cohen Syndrome
GMAP210 Achondrogenesis type IA
Golgin A2 a complex, neuromuscular disorder
GORAB Gerodermia osteodysplastica

References

Cell anatomy
Histology
Matrices (biology)
Organelles